LARES (Laser Relativity Satellite) is a passive satellite system of the Italian Space Agency.

Mission

LARES 1 
LARES 1 was launched into orbit on 13 February 2012 at 10:00:00 UTC. It was launched on the first Vega rocket from the ESA Centre Spatial Guyanais in Kourou, French Guiana.

Composition 
The satellite is made of THA-18N, a tungsten alloy, and houses 92 cube-corner retroreflectors, which are used to track the satellite via laser from stations on Earth. LARES was inserted in a nearly circular  orbit near  and an inclination of 69.49 degrees. The satellite is tracked by the International Laser Ranging Service stations.

The LARES satellite is the densest object known orbiting the Earth. The high density helps reduce disturbances from environmental factors such as solar radiation pressure.

Scientific goals 
The main scientific target of the LARES mission is the measurement of the Lense–Thirring effect with an accuracy of about 1%, according to principal investigator Ignazio Ciufolini and the LARES scientific team, but the reliability of that estimate is contested.

In contrast, a recent analysis of 3.5 years of laser-ranging data reported a claimed accuracy of about 4%. Critical remarks appeared later in the literature.

Beyond the project's key mission, the LARES satellite may be used for other tests of general relativity as well as measurements in the fields of geodynamics and satellite geodesy.

LARES 2 
A second satellite, LARES 2, was launched into orbit on 13 July 2022 at 13:13:43 UTC on a Vega-C. It was originally due to launch in mid-2021. The launch was delayed to mid-2022 due to continuing impacts from the COVID-19 pandemic.

LARES 2 may improve the accuracy of the frame-dragging effect measurement to 0.2%. LARES 2 is made of a nickel alloy instead of a tungsten alloy.

See also

 LAGEOS similar satellites launched in 1976
 List of laser ranging satellites
 List of passive satellites
 PAGEOS
 Project Echo
 Vega flight VV01

References

External links 
 LARES Mission: official Web Site of LARES Mission.
 LARES - Testing of General Relativity on ASI's page.
 LARES - Pronto al via! article with images of LARES on ASI's site (in Italian).
 LARES Satellite Information LARES page on the ILRS Web Site.

2012 in Italy
Satellites orbiting Earth
Italian Space Agency
Laser ranging satellites
Satellites of Italy
Spacecraft launched by Vega rockets
Spacecraft launched in 2012